No Smoking is a 1955 British comedy film directed by Henry Cass and starring Reg Dixon, Peter Martyn, Belinda Lee and Lionel Jeffries. It was produced by Tempean Films as a second feature. The film was shot at Southall Studios with sets designed by the art director Wilfred Arnold. Shortly after the production Lee was signed up for a contract with the Rank Organisation.

Synopsis 
Reg Bates is a scientist who invents a pill that can cure smokers of their nicotine addiction. This is revealed by a visiting American, Hal Hurst. Bates faces strong opposition from both the tobacco industry and the government.

Cast 

 Reg Dixon as Reg Bates
 Peter Martyn as Hal Hurst
 Belinda Lee as Miss Tonkins
 Ruth Trouncer as Joyce
 Alexander Gauge as Wellington-Simpson
 Lionel Jeffries as George Pogson
 Myrtle Rowe as Milly
 Arthur Young as Joe Dawson
 Hal Osmond as Yokel
 Tom Gill as Foreign Office Official
 Ronnie Stevens as BBC Man
 Alan Robinson as Thackery
 Bill Lowe as Civil Servant
 Doris Hare as Customer
 Ian Fleming as Doctor Moxom
 Patrick Jordan as Reporter
 Alan Gifford as American Ambassador
 Roger Maxwell as Major
 Scott Harrold as Man in Surgery
 Jan Holden as Receptionist
 Phil Park as Vicar
 James Raglan as Chancellor

Production
It was based on a 1952 TV play. One review said it had "plenty of good family fun."

It was made at Alliance Studios, Southall. It was one of only a few movies starring Reg Dixon. It was one of several comedies featuring Belinda Lee.

Reception
The Monthly Film Bulletin said "the action does not fizz; the bubbles never quite come to the surface."

References

External links
 
No Smoking at BFI
No Smoking at Reel Streets
No Smoking at Letterbox DVD

1955 films
British comedy films
1955 comedy films
Films directed by Henry Cass
Films shot at Southall Studios
Films set in England
1950s English-language films
1950s British films
British black-and-white films